Jani Tuomala (born 3 February 1977) is a Finnish footballer, who currently plays for Pallo-Iirot.

References

1977 births
Living people
Finnish footballers
People from Porvoo
Turun Palloseura footballers
FC Lahti players
Myllykosken Pallo −47 players
IF Sylvia players
Veikkausliiga players
Finnish expatriate footballers
Expatriate footballers in Sweden
Association football goalkeepers
Sportspeople from Uusimaa